In Your House 3 (retroactively titled In Your House 3: Triple Header) was the third In Your House professional wrestling pay-per-view (PPV) event produced by the World Wrestling Federation (WWF, now WWE). It took place on September 24, 1995, at the Saginaw Civic Center in Saginaw, Michigan. The PPV portion of the show featured six matches in total, while four dark matches also occurred. With the launch of the WWE Network in 2014, the PPV section became available to subscribers to view on demand.

The main event of the show featured all three active championships in the WWF at the time being defended. The WWF World Heavyweight Champion Diesel teamed up with the WWF Intercontinental Champion Shawn Michaels and they were slated to take on the reigning WWF World Tag Team Champions Yokozuna and Owen Hart in a match where the person who was pinned would lose the championship. As part of the storyline the WWF replaced Owen Hart with The British Bulldog, due to Hart's wife being in labor. In the end Owen Hart did appear at the show and was pinned to end the match, but since he was not deemed the legal man in the match, the next night on Raw, the WWF World Tag Team Championship was awarded back to Hart and Yokozuna.

In Your House 3 was the first WWF PPV of the Monday Night Wars era of September 4, 1995, to March 26, 2001. During this time, WWF's Raw and World Championship Wrestling's Nitro competed for ratings in a weekly Monday night time slot, now widely seen as the "golden age" of pro-wrestling.

Production

Background
In Your House was a series of monthly pay-per-view (PPV) shows first produced by the World Wrestling Federation (WWF, now WWE) in May 1995. They aired when the promotion was not holding one of its then-five major PPVs (WrestleMania, King of the Ring, SummerSlam, Survivor Series, and Royal Rumble), and were sold at a lower cost. This third In Your House event took place on September 24, 1995, at the Saginaw Civic Center in Saginaw, Michigan. While this event was originally known simply as In Your House 3, it was later retroactively renamed as In Your House 3: Triple Header. This retroactive renaming of the show was based on the event featuring all three active championships in the WWF at the time being defended: the WWF World Heavyweight Championship, the WWF Intercontinental Championship, and the WWF World Tag Team Championship.

Storylines
The professional wrestling matches at In Your House 3 featured professional wrestlers performing as characters in scripted events pre-determined by the hosting promotion, World Wrestling Federation (WWF). Storylines between the characters played out on WWF's primary television programs, Monday Night Raw.

Event
In the main event, three championships were on the line: Diesel's WWF World Heavyweight Championship, Shawn Michaels' WWF Intercontinental Championship, and Yokozuna and Owen Hart's WWF World Tag Team Championship. If Diesel had been pinned, he would have lost the WWF World Heavyweight Championship and if Michaels had been pinned he would have lost the Intercontinental Championship. On the night of the show, the WWF announced that the British Bulldog had to replace Owen Hart in the match, as Hart was with his wife at the hospital, as she was giving birth to their second child. Near the end of the match. it was revealed that this was just a storyline as Owen Hart rushed to the ring in full wrestling gear and interfered in the match. Moments later, Diesel pinned Owen Hart to win the match and supposedly win the tag team championship, but it was later announced that while Diesel and Michaels did win the match, they did not win the tag team championship, as Owen Hart was not the legal man in the match.

Aftermath
The following month's In Your House, In Your House 4 on October 22, 1995, saw Diesel successfully defend the WWF World Heavyweight Championship against the British Bulldog, concluding the  feud that had been building since the Bulldog turned on Diesel in August of that year. At the same show, it was revealed that Shawn Michaels was unable to compete after being in a fight with a number of Marines and he had to forfeit the WWF Intercontinental Championship to Dean Douglas. Yokozuna and Owen Hart were given the tag team championship belts back after In Your House 3, but lost them to The Smoking Gunns (Billy Gunn and Bart Gunn) a short time later.

Results

Other on-screen personnel

References

03
Professional wrestling in Michigan
1995 in Michigan
Events in Michigan
1995 WWF pay-per-view events
September 1995 events in the United States